A satchel-mouth is a goosefish native to the eastern coast of North America.

Satchel-mouth or Satchelmouth or variant, may also refer to:

 Satchel-mouth (princess) (1318-1369), Countess of Tyrol
 Satchelmouth (musician) (1901-1971), American jazz musician
 Mr. Satchelmouth Lemon, a fictional character from the 1994 novel Soul Music by Terry Pratchett

See also

 Satchel (disambiguation)
 Mouth (disambiguation)